Broadwater is a suburb of the Western Australian city of Busselton. At the 2021 census, it had a population of 4,269.
 
Broadwater was gazetted in 1897; it originally contained what is now the  Busselton suburb of Abbey. It contains a mix of residential areas and tourist accommodation providers, which take advantage of its proximity to the foreshore at Geographe Bay. A drive-in cinema was built in Broadwater in 1960; by the time of its closure in 2015, it was one of the last such structures in Western Australia.

References

Suburbs of Busselton